Prince Dmitry Ivanovich Lobanov-Rostovsky (20 September 1758 – 25/26 July 1838) was a Russian general and administrator. He stemmed from the Lobanov-Rostovsky family.

Biography 
After Russia's defeat at Friedland on 14 June 1807, Russia asked for an armistice, which Lobanov-Rostovsky signed on Russia's behalf on 30 June 1807 (with marshal Louis-Alexandre Berthier signing for France). 

With prince Alexander Kurakin, he participated in the following negotiations and was one of the plenipotentiaries who signed of the Treaty of Tilsit on 7 July 1807, on behalf of the Tzar.

Career 
From 12 January 1808 to 12 February 1809 Rostovsky was governor of Saint Petersburg).  

From 1810 Since December 1810 Rostovsky was the Livonian, Estland and Kurland governor-general and the Riga military governor, taking over from Friedrich von Buxhoeveden, until 1812, when he himself was replaced Philip Paulucci at the beginning of the 1812 war. 

Under Rostovsky governorship Riga garrison was strengthened and the Daugavgrīvas fortress was rebuilt. He was minister of justice from 25 August 1817 to 18 October 1827.

Notes

References
Edition 1809, The Annual Register, Or, A View of the History, Politics, and Literature for the Year 1807, James Dodsley.

1758 births
1838 deaths
Military personnel from Moscow
People from Moskovsky Uyezd
Dmitry
Russian princes
Politicians of the Russian Empire
Justice ministers of Russia
Russian people of the Polish–Russian War of 1792
Russian people of the Kościuszko Uprising
Russian commanders of the Napoleonic Wars
Recipients of the Order of St. George of the Third Degree